Sandro Zakany (born 23 September 1987) is an Austrian footballer who plays for SK Austria Klagenfurt.

References

Austrian footballers
Austrian Football Bundesliga players
1987 births
Living people
FC Kärnten players
SK Austria Kärnten players
FC Admira Wacker Mödling players
LASK players

Association football midfielders